During the early 17th century, England's relative naval power deteriorated, In the course of the rest of the 17th century, The office of the Admiralty and Marine Affairs steered the Navy's transition from a semi-amateur Navy Royal fighting in conjunction with private vessels into a fully professional institution, a Royal Navy. Its financial provisions were gradually regularised, it came to rely on dedicated warships only, and it developed a professional officer corps with a defined career structure, superseding an earlier mix of sailors and socially prominent former soldiers.

Historical overview

After 1603 the English and Scottish fleets were organized together under James I but the efficiency of the Navy declined gradually, while corruption grew until brought under control in an inquiry of 1618. James concluded a peace with Spain and privateering was outlawed. Between 1618 and 1628, a Navy Commission temporarily replaced the Navy Board, due to misappropriation of public funds by board commissioners. After the inquiry was over the office of the Lord High Admiral (held by the Duke of Buckingham) was restored. However, he was murdered and King Charles I put the office into commission. This led to the creation of a new Board of Admiralty which in its early formation was just the Privy Council in another reincarnation. This in turn also led to the removal of the Admiralty Court from direct control of the Lord High Admiral's. His office was temporarily restored again in 1638, but then put in commission once more after 1679 the Lords Commissioners of Admiralty became the permanent officers responsible for administration of the Navy.

Organization in the seventeenth century

Admiralty of England

Commanders-in-chief
 Queen Elizabeth I
 King James I & VI
 King Charles I
 Lord Protectors, Oliver Cromwell, Richard Cromwell
 King Charles II
 King James II & VII
 King William III and Queen Mary II
 Queen Anne

Naval Lords of England
Office of the Lord High Admiral of England
Vice-Admiral of England and Deputy Lord High Admiral
Rear-Admiral of England

Civil administration of the Navy
Notes: the Secretary of State England for the period 1628 to 1679 was responsible for all policy decisions and direction on behalf of the government due to a continued state of war.

Board of Admiralty
The Board of Admiralty and the Lord's Commissioners executing the office of the Lord High Admiral

 The Board of Admiralty

First Commissioner and First Lord of the Admiralty 
First Lord of the Admiralty, and member of the English government
Clerk of the Admiralty
Messenger of the Admiralty, appointed, 1687
Housekeeper of the Admiralty appointed (1687 – 1799)
Doorkeeper of the Admiralty, 1687
Gardner of the Admiralty appointed (1687 – 1799)

Civil Commissioner
Chief Secretary to the Admiralty (1628 – 1652)
First Secretary to the Admiralty (1652 – 1871)

Naval Commissioner
Naval Lord from (1682 – 1689)
Senior Naval Lord from (1689–1771)

Lords Commissioners of the Admiralty

91 commissioners served during the 17th century.

Notes: Between 1693 and 1830 the commission always included either 1 or 2 additional naval lords except from 1757 until 1782 when it was just the Senior Naval Lord. After 1830 the Naval Lords are titled, First, Second, Third, Fourth until 1904 when they are re-styled Sea Lord. A junior naval lord is introduced in 1868 until 1903 then is re-styled Fifth Sea Lord from 1917.

Naval operations

Senior leadership
Naval High Command
Office of the Lord High Admiral of England (1600 – 1628)
Office of the Vice-Admiral of England
Office of the Rear-Admiral of England
Office of the First Lord of the Admiralty (1628 – 1964)
Office of the Naval Lord of the Admiralty*
Admiralty Secretariat, (1690-1932) 
Greenwich Hospital
Nautical Almanac Office
Register office 
Royal Observatory
Sixpenny Office

Fleet commands
Flag officers of the fleet

Admiral of the Fleet Red 
Vice-Admiral of the Red 
 Rear-Admiral of the Red
Admiral of the White  
Vice-Admiral of the White  
Rear-Admiral of the White
Admiral of the Blue  
Vice-Admiral of the Blue 
Rear-Admiral of the Blue

Flag officers commanding fleets and stations
Flag officer commanding individual fleets and stations

Home commands
 Admiral Commanding, the Narrow Seas, (1412-1688)
 Admiral/Vice-Admiral Commanding, in the Channel. (1512-1746)
 Commander-in-Chief, the Downs, (1628-1834)
 Commander-in-Chief, Medway, (1698-1699) 
 Commander-in-Chief, Portsmouth (1667-1969)
 Commander, Royal Squadron, (1660-1995)
 Commander-in-Chief, Thames,  (1695-1696)
 Commander-in-Chief, Western Squadron, (1650-1854)

Shore commands
 Vice-Admiralties of the Coast of England, Scotland, Ireland and Wales, (1536-1830)

Overseas commands
 Commander-in-Chief, Jamaica Station (1655-1830)
 Commander-in-Chief, Mediterranean Fleet (1690-1967)

Fleet units

Squadrons 
 Red Squadron
 White Squadron
 Blue Squadron

Administrative and logistical support

Board of ordnance

Principal officers
Board of Ordnance  (1597 – 1855)
Office of the Board of Ordnance
Master-General of the Ordnance (1597 – 1855)
Lieutenant-General of the Ordnance (1597 – 1855) 
Treasurer of the Ordinance (1597 – 1855)
Surveyor-General of the Ordnance (1597 – 1888)
Clerk of the Ordnance (1554 – 1853)
Storekeeper of the Ordnance (1558 – 1845)
Clerk of Deliveries of the Ordnance (1570 – 1812)

Ordnance yards and stores
Home ordinance yards
The Gun Wharf, Chatham Dockyard
Gunwharf Portsmouth Dockyard

Gunpowder magazines stores
Tower of London, London (1461 – 1855)
Square Tower, Portsmouth (1584 – 1855)

Navy board
Construction, design, maintenance, supplies

Principal officers
Office of the Navy Board 
Comptroller of the Navy (1597 – 1832)
Surveyor of the Navy (1597 – 1832)
Treasurer of the Navy (1597 – 1832)
 Clerk of the Navy
Surveyor-General Victuals, (1550-1679)
Controller of Treasurer Accounts, (1667-1796)
Controller of Victualling Accounts, (1667-1796)
Controller of Storekeepers Accounts, (1671-1796)
Commissioners for Old Accounts, (1686-8)
Commissioners for Current Business, (1686-8)
Commissioners for Examining Accounts (Incurred), (1688-9)

Subsidiary boards of navy board
Office of the Navy Board 
Sick and Hurt Board (established temporarily in times of war from 1653, placed on a permanent footing from 1715)
Victualling Board (1683 – 1832)
Transport Board (1690 – 1724, re-established 1794)

Shore facilities
Note: Dockyards during this period were managed by the commissioners of the Navy Board.

Home naval base and dockyards
Portsmouth Dockyard  (1496 – present)
Woolwich Dockyard  (1512 – 1869)
Deptford Dockyard (1513 – 1869)
Erith Dockyard (1514 – 1521), failed yard: due to persistent flooding
Chatham Dockyard (1567 – 1983)
Sheerness Dockyard (1665 – 1957)
Plymouth Dockyard, Plymouth (1690 – 1824)

Oversea bases and dockyards
Jamaica Dockyard, Port Royal, Jamaica (1675 – 1905)

Judicial administration
Note:Admiralty Courts date to at least the 1360s, during the reign of Edward III. At that time there were three such Courts, appointed by Admirals responsible for waters to the north, south and west of England. In 1483 these local courts were amalgamated into a single High Court of Admiralty, administered by the Lord High Admiral of England. The Deputy Lord High Admiral presided over the High Court.

Admiralty courts
Lord High Admiral of England
Vice Admiral of England and Deputy Lord High Admiral
Advocate General to the office of the Lord High Admiral

Legal advisors to the admiralty courts
Office of the Lord High Admiral
Counsel to the Admiralty,(1673 – 1824), attached originally to the Navy Board
Solicitor for the Affairs of the Admiralty and Navy, appointed (1692 – 1799)

High court of the admiralty
Office of the High Court of the Admiralty Court (1450 – 1875)
Judge of the High Court of Admiralty
Judge Advocate of the Fleet
Deputy Judge Advocate of the Fleet
Proctor of the High Court of Admiralty
Marshall of the High Court of Admiralty
Droits of the High Court of Admiralty

Vice admiralty courts
The Vice-Admiral of the Coast  was responsible for the defence of one of the twenty maritime counties of England, the North and South of Wales. As a Vice-Admiral, the post holder was the chief of naval administration for his district. His responsibilities included deciding the outcome of the Prize court (captured by pirate ships), dealing with salvage claims for wrecks, and acting as a judge in relation to maritime issues.
 Vice-Admiral Cheshire (1559 – 1835)
 Vice-Admiral Cornwall (1559 – 1917)
 Vice-Admiral Cumberland (1559 – 1835)
 Vice-Admiral Devon (1559 – 1835)
 Vice-Admiral Dorset (1559 – 1835)
 Vice-Admiral Durham (1559 – 1835)
 Vice-Admiral Essex (1559 – 1835)
 Vice-Admiral Gloucestershire (1559 – 1835)
 Vice-Admiral Hampshire (1558 – 1846)
 Vice-Admiral Kent (1558 – 1846)
 Vice-Admiral Lancashire (1569 – 1861)
 Vice-Admiral Lincolnshire (1565 – 1862)
 Vice-Admiral Norfolk (1554 – 1846)
 Vice-Admiral Northumberland (1559 – 1847)
 Vice-Admiral Somerset (1561 – 1865)
 Vice-Admiral Suffolk (1554 – 1947)
 Vice-Admiral Sussex (1559 – 1860)
 Vice-Admiral Westmorland (1559 – 1802)
 Vice-Admiral Yorkshire (1559 – 1860)

Vice Admiralty jurisdictions and prizes abroad

By appointing Vice-Admirals in the colonies, and by constituting courts as Vice-Admiralty Courts, the terminology recognized the existence and superiority of the "mother" court in the United Kingdom.  Thus, the "vice" tag denoted that whilst it was a separate court, it was not equal to the "mother" court.  In the case of the courts abroad, a right of appeal lay back to the British Admiralty Court, which further reinforced this superiority.  In all respects, the court was an Imperial court rather than a local Colonial court.

North America
Vice-Admiral Carolina
Vice-Admiral Maryland
Vice-Admiral Massachusetts
Vice-Admiral New Hampshire
Vice-Admiral New York, including Connecticut 
Vice-Admiral Pennsylvania, including Delaware
Vice-Admiral Virginia
 
West Indies
Vice-Admiral Barbados
Vice-Admiral Jamaica

See also
Admiralty in the 16th century
Admiralty in the 18th century

References

Sources
The Statutes of the United Kingdom of Great Britain and Ireland, 3 George IV. 1822.  London: By His Majesty's Statute and Law Printer.  1822.
Hamilton, Admiral Sir. R. Vesey, G.C.B. (1896).  Naval Administration: The Constitution, Character, and Functions of the Board of Admiralty, and of the Civil Departments it Directs.  London: George Bell and Sons.
Logan, Karen Dale (1976).  The Admiralty: Reforms and Re-organization, 1868-1892.  Unpublished Ph.D. dissertation.  University of Oxford.
Miller, Francis H. (1884).  The Origin and Constitution of the Admiralty and Navy Boards, to which is added an Account of the various Buildings in which the Business of the Navy has been transacted from time to time.  London: For Her Majesty's Stationery Office.  Copy in Greene Papers.  National Maritime Museum.  GEE/19.
 Rodger. N.A.M. (1979), The Admiralty (offices of state), T. Dalton, Lavenham, .

External links
 
 
 

History of the Royal Navy